The Open Source Applications Foundation (OSAF) was a non-profit organization founded in 2002 by Mitch Kapor whose purpose was to effect widespread adoption of  free software/open-source software.

History
Founded in 2002 by Mitch Kapor to effect widespread adoption of free software/open-source software.

The 2007 book Dreaming in Code: Two Dozen Programmers, Three Years, 4,732 Bugs, and One Quest for Transcendent Software documented the struggles of OSAF in building an open source calendar application, Chandler.

In January 2008 Mitch Kapor ended his involvement with the foundation, stepped down from the board, and provided transitional funding. In the restructure that followed, Katie Capps Parlante became acting president. There were at one time eleven employees with Sheila Mooney as president.

Projects 
 Chandler – a note-to-self organiser (personal information management (PIM) software) designed for personal and small-group task management and calendaring. Chandler Desktop and Chandler Hub (an instance of Chandler Server (Cosmo)) are complementary. Chandler is written in Python and runs on Linux, Mac OS X and Windows.

 Cosmo (Chandler Server) –  a Java-based content/calendar sharing server with a built-in rich web application client.

From 2005, OSAF participated in Google's Summer of Code programs by allowing several interns to work on OSAF projects during the summer.

OSAF Funds
Major contributors to OSAF included:
 Mitch Kapor: US$5 million
 Andrew W. Mellon Foundation: US$98,000
 Andrew W. Mellon Foundation: US$1.5 million
 Common Solutions Group: US$1.25 million

OSAF Mission 
The mission of the OSAF was stated this way:

 Create and gain wide adoption of open source application software of uncompromising quality.
 Carry forward the vision of Vannevar Bush, Doug Engelbart, and Ted Nelson of the computer as a medium for communication, collaboration, and coordination.
 Design a new application to manage personal information including notes, mail, tasks, appointments and events, contacts, documents and other personal resources.
 Enable sharing with colleagues, friends and family. In particular, meet the unique and under-served needs of small group collaboration.
 Demonstrate that open source software *can* serve a general audience in the consumer market.
 Offer a choice of platforms and full interoperability amongst Windows, Macintosh, and Linux versions.
 Leverage our resources by using an open source model of development.

External links
 Open Source Applications Foundation Site
 The Chandler Project Website

Free software project foundations in the United States